Sheng is a Swahili and English-based cant, perhaps a mixed language or creole, originating among the urban youth of Nairobi, Kenya, and influenced by many of the languages spoken there. While primarily a language of urban youths, it has spread across social classes and geographically to neighbouring Tanzania and Uganda.

Etymology and history
The word "Sheng" is coined from the two languages that it is mainly derived from: Swahili and English. The "h" was included from the middle of "Swahili because "Seng" would have sounded unusual. The term is first recorded in 1965.

Originating in the early 1950s in the Eastlands area of Nairobi (variously described as a "slum", "ghetto" or "suburb"), Sheng is now heard among matatu drivers/touts across the region, and in the popular media. Most of the Sheng words are introduced in various communities and schools and given wide exposure by music artists who include them in their lyrics, hence the rapid growth. It can be assumed to be the first language of many Kenyans in urban areas.

Like all slang, Sheng is mainly used by the youth and is part of popular culture in Kenya. It also evolves rapidly, as words are moved into and out of slang use. It found broad usage among hip hop artists such as Kalamashaka and G.rongi in the African Great Lakes region in the '90s, both mainstream and "underground" (whose music helped spread the language and contribute to rapid changes or shifts in Sheng vocabulary), as well as among virtually all university and secondary-school students, the language was not always associated with people who cannot do much for the society until when the Kenya Broadcasting Corporation noted the rise in both class and diversity. Radio presenters John Karani, Jeff Mwangemi and Prince Otach, and many more, took it to the mainstream by presenting the first radio shows using Sheng phrases on the national broadcast. By 2010 almost every media show had some sort of sheng it.

Although the grammar, syntax, and much of the vocabulary are drawn from Swahili, Sheng borrows from the languages of some of the largest ethnic groups in Kenya, including Luhya, Gĩkũyũ, Luo and Kamba. Words are also borrowed from languages that are neither a local language nor English – such as the Sheng word morgen "morning" – a Sheng word used in some areas with a similar meaning in German.

Sheng vocabulary can vary significantly within Kenya's various subdivisions and the larger African Great Lakes region, and even between neighbourhoods in Nairobi. Many youth living in the capital often use the argot as their everyday mode of communication rather than Swahili or English.

Sheng in literature

The written use of Sheng in literature is still a minor phenomenon. Some poems in the African literary magazine Kwani?  have been published in Sheng, but the first and only book in this language is "Lafudhi hip hop poetry in Sheng" (2015), written by G rongi.

Sample vocabulary

Examples

See also
 Engsh
 Kenyan English

References

Additional literature
Abdulaziz, Mohamed H. and Ken Osinde. 1997. Sheng and Engsh: development of mixed codes among the urban youth in Kenya. International Journal of the Sociology of Language 125 (Sociolinguistic Issues in Sub-Saharan Africa), pp. 45–63.
Beck, Rose Marie. 2015. "Sheng: an urban variety of Swahili in Kenya." Youth Language Practices in Africa and Beyond, Nico Nassenstein and Andrea Hollington, (eds.) 51–79. Berlin: de Gruyter.
Bosire, Mokaya. 2009. What makes a Sheng word unique? Lexical manipulation in mixed languages. In AkinloyeOjo & Lioba Moshi (Eds), Selected Proceedings of the 39th Annual Conference on African Linguistics, 77–85.
Bosire, Mokaya. 2006. Hybrid languages: The case of Sheng. In Olaoba F. Arasanyin & Michael A.Pemberton (Eds). Selected Proceedings of the 36th Annual Conference on African Linguistics, 185–193.
Fee, D., & Moga, J. 1997. Sheng dictionary.Third edition. Nairobi: Ginseng Publishers.
Fink, Teresa Kathleen. 2005. Attitudes toward languages in Nairobi. Diss. University of Pittsburgh.
Githinji, Peter. 2005. Sheng and variation: The construction and negotiation of layered identities. PhD dissertation, Michigan State University.
Githinji, Peter. 2006. Bazes and Their Shibboleths: Lexical Variation and Sheng Speakers' Identity in Nairobi. Nordic Journal of African Studies 15(4): 443–472.
Githiora, Chege. 2002. Sheng: peer language, Swahili dialect or emerging Creole? Journal of African Cultural Studies Volume 15, Number 2, pp. 159–181.
Githiora, Chege J. Sheng: rise of a Kenyan Swahili vernacular. Boydell & Brewer, 2018
Kang’ethe-Iraki, Frederick. 2004. Cognitive Efficiency: The Sheng phenomenon in Kenya. Pragmatics 14(1): 55–68.
Kießling, Roland & Maarten Mous. 2004. Urban Youth Languages in Africa. Anthropological Linguistics 46(3): 303-341
Mazrui, Alamin. 1995. Slang and Codeswitching: The case of Sheng in Kenya. Afrikanistische Arbeitspapiere 42: 168–179.
Ogechi, Nathan Oyori. 2002. Trilingual Codeswitching in Kenya – Evidence from Ekegusii, Kiswahili, English and Sheng. Doctoral dissertation, Universität Hamburg.
Ogechi, Nathan. 2005. On Lexicalization in Sheng. Nordic Journal of African Studies 14(3): 334–355.
Samper, David. 2002. Talking Sheng: The role of a Hybrid Language in the Construction of Identity and Youth Culture in Nairobi Kenya. PhD Dissertation, University of Pennsylvania.
Spyropoulos, Mary. 1987. Sheng: some preliminary investigations into a recently emerged Nairobi street language. Journal of the Anthropological Society 18 (1): 125–136.
Vierke, Clarissa. 2015. "Some remarks on poetic aspects of Sheng." Global Repertoires and Urban Fluidity. Youth Languages in Africa, Nico Nassenstein and Andrea Hollington, (eds.) 227–256. Berlin: de Gruyter.

External links
Sheng – Dictionary and Translator 
Talking Sheng: The role of a hybrid language in the construction of identity and youth culture in Nairobi, Kenya
African Languages – Sheng – English–Sheng/Sheng–English lexicon

Languages of Kenya
Swahili-based pidgins and creoles
Cant languages
English-based argots

African Urban Youth Languages
1965 neologisms
Languages attested from the 1950s